The Horse Heaven Hills AVA is an American Viticultural Area in southeastern Washington, and is part of the larger Columbia Valley AVA. The Horse Heaven Hills AVA borders the Yakima Valley AVA on the north and the Columbia River on the south. Grapes planted in the south-facing slopes of the Horse Heaven Hills benefit from strong winds that arrive from the west via the Columbia Gorge, reducing the likelihood of rot and fungal diseases.

Wineries

Horse Heaven Hills AVA is home to the single largest wine making facility in Washington, the Columbia Crest Winery owned by Chateau Ste. Michelle in Paterson. Alexandria Nicole Cellars has a large vineyard at Destiny Ridge. 

The AVA is also home to Zephyr Ridge Vineyard, which produces grapes for many wineries in Washington, including Hogue Cellars and Swiftwater Cellars.

Wines 
Some of Washington's cult wines are produced from Cabernet Sauvignon grapes grown in this AVA including the 2002 and 2003 Quilceda Creek Vintners Cabernet Sauvignon, which scored the rare 100 point rating from Robert Parker's The Wine Advocate. Only 15 other wines in the US have received this designation, all made from California grapes. Only five other previous vintages have received consecutive perfect scores in The Wine Advocate's publishing history. The Quilceda Creek wines were blends with grapes from three Red Mountain AVA vineyards and one Horse Heaven Hills AVA vineyard.

See also
Champoux Vineyard, a well known vineyard in the AVA that is featured on several vineyard designated wines

References

American Viticultural Areas
Geography of Benton County, Washington
Geography of Klickitat County, Washington
Horse Heaven Hills
Washington (state) wine
Geography of Yakima County, Washington
2005 establishments in Washington (state)